Czechoslovakia competed at the 1980 Winter Paralympics in Geilo, Norway. Three competitors from Czechoslovakia won one silver medal and finished 10th in the medal table.

Alpine skiing 

Eva Lemezova won the silver medal in the Women's Slalom 3A event. She also competed at the Women's Giant Slalom 3A and finished 4th.

Jaroslaw Pauer competed in the Men's Giant Slalom 1A and Men's Slalom 1A events.

Pavel Teply competed in the Men's Giant Slalom 3A and Men's Slalom 3A events.

See also 

 Czechoslovakia at the Paralympics
 Czechoslovakia at the 1980 Winter Olympics

References 

Czechoslovakia at the Paralympics
1980 in Czechoslovak sport
Nations at the 1980 Winter Paralympics